Austin Darragh (27 April 1927 – 4 October 2015) was an Irish medical practitioner, entrepreneur, broadcaster and writer. He is notable for being the sole founder of the Irish Cancer Society in 1963, and being the radio doctor on The Gay Byrne Show.

Early life and history 
He was educated at the Catholic University School on Leeson Street, Dublin and graduated from Trinity College in 1954. He met Marie Therese "Terry" Roddy while studying in college, they married in 1950 and had five children. In 1992, Roddy died from cancer. Darragh was also a professor in the University of Limerick for a number of years focussing on biomass. He married Anna Longdon in 1998, and was married to her until his death late 2015.

1987 kidnapping ordeal 
In 1987, Darragh's son-in-law John O'Grady, who was a dentist, was kidnapped. The gang had intended to seize Austin himself, but Darragh had moved three years previously from the house, which was occupied by O'Grady. Due to O'Hare demanding a ransom of IR£1.5m and not getting it, O'Hare chopped O'Grady's pinky finger on each hand with a hammer and chisel.

Death 
He was buried in a plot at Rathfeigh Cemetery where his son and wife are also buried near his residence.

References 

Irish general practitioners
1927 births
2015 deaths
Irish obstetricians